C.O.P. The Recruit is a video game published by Ubisoft for the Nintendo DS. The game was announced at E3 2009 at the Nintendo conference. The game was originally registered under numerous names, one of which being Driver: The Recruit.

Plot
The game follows Dan Miles, a former street racer who becomes a new recruit in the Criminal Overturn Program (C.O.P.). Under the terms of the C.O.P., Dan becomes a detective working to protect the citizens of New York City against large-scale threats. Working with his mentor, Detective Brad Winter, Dan is investigating a series of terrorist attacks in the city when Brad is falsely arrested, putting the investigation on hold. While trying to uncover the truth behind Brad's arrest, Dan goes undercover and returns to his life on the streets. Little by little he gets wrapped up in a deadly, widespread conspiracy and must work to prevent a potentially catastrophic attack on the city.

Gameplay
The game is a third person shooter and a driving game set in New York City, with the same map layout and environment as Driver: Parallel Lines (confirming its relation with the Driver series), however due to memory constraints lacking the island of Bronx. The game has around 51 missions with over 20 hours of gameplay. It's also possible, using the DS system's microphone (and the in-game PDA), to call the S.W.A.T. team, create barricades, road blocks, call an ambulance and access the city's camera system.

Reception

C.O.P. The Recruit received "mixed" reviews according to video game review aggregator Metacritic.

The game won two Best of E3 2009 Awards: Best Action Game and Best Graphics Technology.

References

External links
Official website

Video games set in New York City
Ubisoft games
Nintendo DS-only games
Nintendo DS games
2009 video games
Action-adventure games
Open-world video games
Video games about police officers
Video games scored by Jason Graves
Video games developed in France